Yorkshire Electricity was an electricity distribution utility in England, serving much of Yorkshire and parts of Derbyshire, Lincolnshire and Nottinghamshire.

History
Formed as the Yorkshire Electricity Board in 1948 as part of the nationalisation of the electricity industry by the Electricity Act 1947. The establishment of the company involved the amalgamation of 50 private and local authority power companies. The Yorkshire Electricity Board took over Scarcroft Lodge in north Leeds as its headquarters.

Nationalised industry 
The Yorkshire Electricity Board was responsible for the purchase of electricity from the electricity generator (the Central Electricity Generating Board from 1958) and its distribution and sale of electricity to customers. The key people on the board were chairman Arthur Bond (1964, 1967), deputy chairman R. H. M. Barkham (1964, 1967), and full-time member J. S. Yates (1964, 1967).

The total number of customers supplied by the board was:

The amount of electricity, in GWh, sold by Yorkshire Electricity Board was:

Post privatisation 
Yorkshire Electricity Board was privatised in 1990 as the Yorkshire Electricity Group plc.

In June 1993, Homepower stores were opened across the Yorkshire region. Homepower was the retail arm of the company which was a joint venture with East Midlands Electricity. At its peak, Homepower employed 900 people and had 130 stores. This part of the company was sold off in 1996.

In 1997 the company was acquired by American Electric Power (AEP) and Public Service Company of Colorado (part of Xcel Energy) in a deal worth £1.5 billion. In 2001 Innogy plc bought 94.75% of the company in a deal worth £1.8 billion. The company was subsequently split into two entities, one a supply company, the other a distribution utility. The distribution company (Yorkshire Electricity Distribution Limited) was disposed of to CE Electric UK in 2001 in exchange for the supply business of Northern Electric. Northern Powergrid is now the licensed distribution network operator for the Yorkshire region. In 2002, the company divested itself of its Leeds Headquarters as most staff and processes had been transferred to the Midlands headquarters of npower by that time.

Innogy was itself taken over by RWE. The supply company now trades as npower.

See also
npower (UK)

References

External links

 

Electric power companies of England
Utilities of England
Former nationalised industries of the United Kingdom
Public utilities established in 1948
Companies disestablished in 1997
1948 establishments in England
1997 disestablishments in England
Defunct companies based in Leeds